The 2012 Maine Black Bears football team represented the University of Maine in the 2012 NCAA Division I FCS football season. They were led by 20th-year head coach Jack Cosgrove and played their home games at Alfond Stadium. They are a member of the Colonial Athletic Association. They finished the season 5–6, 4–4 in CAA play to finish in seventh place.

Schedule

 Source: Schedule

Ranking movements

References

Maine
Maine Black Bears football seasons
Maine Black Bears football